The 1961 Railway Cup Hurling Championship was the 35th series of the inter-provincial hurling Railway Cup. Three matches were played between 19 February 1961 and 17 March 1961 to decide the title. It was contested by Connacht, Leinster, Munster and Ulster.

Munster entered the championship as the defending champions.

On 17 March 1961, Munster won the Railway Cup after a 4-12 to 3-09 defeat of Leinster in the final at Croke Park, Dublin. It was their fifth  Railway Cup title in succession.

Munster's Jimmy Doyle was the Railway Cup top scorer with 2-10.

Results

Semi-final

Final

Top scorers

Overall

Single game

External links
 Munster Railway Cup-winning teams

Railway Cup Hurling Championship
Railway Cup Hurling Championship